Zamelah (also Romanized as Zāmelah) is a village in Poshtdarband Rural District, in the Central District of Kermanshah County, Kermanshah Province, Iran. At the 2006 census, its population was 382, in 75 families.

References 

Populated places in Kermanshah County